Ayanpuram, or Ayanavaram, is a neighbourhood in Chennai, India. Konnur High Road, one of the important connecting roads in Chennai runs through Ayanavaram.

Etymology
The neighbourhood was originally known as Ayanpuram, with Ayan meaning Brahma. When Lord Muruga admonished Brahma and took over creation, it is believed that Brahma prayed to Shiva here and got his action of creativity back. It is believed that Brahma worshipped Shiva at Parasurama Easwaran Koil. It is in recognition of that Ayanpuram is named. (It was also called Brahmapuri).

Road transport
Main roads that pass through the neighbourhood include Konnur High Road, Pilkington Road, Constable Road, Anderson Road, Loco Works Road, Carriage Works Road, Ayanavaram Road, Medavakkam Tank Road, and Phipps Road. The neighbourhood is served by the Ayanavaram bus terminus which is attached with a depot for maintenance of buses.

Rail transport
The neighbourhood is served by Perambur, Perambur Carriage Works, Perambur Loco Works, and Villivakkam railway stations.

Jeeva Park
The Jeeva park in Unitied India colony in Ayanvavaram is with the statue of Sarvajña who  was a sixteenth-century poet in the Kannada language. statue has been unveiled  by the then Karnataka Chief Minister B. S. Yediyurappa in a ceremony that was presided over by the then Tamil Nadu Chief Minister, M. Karunanidhi. The statue is installed in the park in reciprocation of installing statue of Tiruvalluvar in Karnataka.

References

Neighbourhoods in Chennai
Suburbs of Chennai
Chennai district
Cities and towns in Chennai district